Kafr Ammar is a village in the Giza Governorate of Egypt. 

The modern village is located on the site of an ancient city Acanthus (in Ptolemy), also called Tenis, on the western bank of the Nile, 120 stadia south of Memphis. The town was in the Memphite Nome, and, therefore, in the Heptanomis. It was celebrated for a temple of Osiris, and received its name from a sacred enclosure composed of the acanthus plants. 

Some scholars identify it with Egyptian city Shena-chen or Shenou-anchou.

See also
 List of ancient Egyptian towns and cities

References

Populated places in Giza Governorate
Cities in ancient Egypt
Former populated places in Egypt